Orilla is the name of a number of ships, including:

, built as Empire Envoy, in service 1952–55
, built as Mohawk Park, in service 1951–52

See also
Orella (disambiguation)

Ship names